The Savoia-Marchetti SM.77 was an Italian transport seaplane developed by Savoia-Marchetti in the 1930s. It represented the latest development of the "double hull" formula started with the Savoia-Marchetti S.55 and continued with the Savoia-Marchetti S.66.

It differed from the previous S.66 in having 3x  (take-off) Alfa Romeo 126 R.C.10 radial engines driving 3-bladed variable pitch propellers, in place of the 3x Fiat A.24R V-12s of the S.66. The wing resumed the one developed for S.M.79 and presented several improvements to hulls and empennage.

References

SM.77
Three-engined pusher aircraft
Flying boats
Twin-fuselage aircraft
1930s Italian airliners
High-wing aircraft
Aircraft first flown in 1931